Mary Dalrymple, FBA (born March 9, 1954) is a professor of syntax at Oxford University.   At Oxford, she is a fellow of Linacre College. Prior to that she was a lecturer in linguistics at King's College London, a senior member of the research staff at the Palo Alto Research Center (formerly the Xerox Palo Alto Research Center) in the Natural Language Theory and Technology group and a computer scientist at SRI International.  She received her PhD in linguistics from  Stanford University in 1990. Her master's degree and bachelor's degree are from the University of Texas, Austin and Cornell College, respectively.  She has also been associated with CSLI (Center for the Study of Language and Information) as a researcher.

Her research focus is on linguistics and computational linguistics and centers mainly on grammar development, syntax, semantics and the syntax-semantics interface.  She has worked on a broad range of languages, including English, Hindi, Marathi, Malagasy and Indonesian.  She is one of the prime architects of Glue Semantics and works primarily within Lexical Functional Grammar (LFG), a linguistic theory for which she has written a textbook Lexical Functional Grammar and to which she has contributed a theory of anaphoric binding.  Her most recent major work has dealt with the relationship between case marking, information structure (topic, focus) and semantics.

Honors and awards:  Mary Dalrymple was inducted as a fellow of the British Academy in 2013.

References

Selected additional publications 

 
 Dalrymple, Mary, Ronald M. Kaplan, and Tracy Holloway King. 2008. The Absence of Traces: Evidence from Weak Crossover.  In Architectures, Rules, and Preferences: Variations on Themes by Joan W. Bresnan, ed. Annie Zaenen, Jane Simpson, Tracy Holloway King, Jane Grimshaw, Joan Maling, and Chris Manning, pp. 85–102. CSLI Publications, Stanford.
 Dalrymple, Mary and Irina Nikolaeva. 2006. Syntax of natural and accidental coordination: Evidence from agreement. Language 82(4), 824-849.
 Dalrymple, Mary and Ronald M. Kaplan. 2000. Feature Indeterminacy and Feature Resolution.  Language 76(4), 759-798.

External links 
 Mary Dalrymple's home page
 British Academy News Item

1954 births
Living people
Linguists from the United Kingdom
Fellows of the British Academy
Academics of King's College London
Women linguists
20th-century linguists
21st-century linguists